The Dixie Center for the Arts, also known as the Dixie Theater or simply the Dixie, is a theater-style venue located at 212 North Vienna Street in Ruston, Louisiana.

The venue originally opened as the Astor Theater in 1928. The Astor offered showings of silent films and live concerts with tickets ranging from 10 to 50 cents. In 1932 the Astor Theater underwent lite renovations with the most notable being the addition of a crystal chandelier and a change in identity from the Astor to the Rialto.

In the early 1950s, the theater underwent one last name change. After being purchased from the famous Dixie Theater Corporation of New Orleans, the space was officially known as the Dixie Theater. The corporation renovated the space and re-opened in 1956. The most notable renovation to the space was the addition of air conditioning and the iconic flashing neon star which rises above the marquee.

After years of neglect and disrepair, the space underwent an extensive renovation to preserve the historic venue. The Dixie Center for the Arts held a grand re-opening for the space in 2006 and has remained the proprietor of the property since.

The building was listed on the National Register of Historic Places on October 14, 1993.

Tenants
In addition to being a rent-able space for various event, many artistic and musical organizations call the Dixie their home.

 North Central Louisiana Arts Council (NCLAC)
 Ruston Community Theater

See also
 National Register of Historic Places listings in Lincoln Parish, Louisiana

References

External links

 Official Site of the Dixie Center for the Arts

Theatres on the National Register of Historic Places in Louisiana
Lincoln Parish, Louisiana
National Register of Historic Places in Lincoln Parish, Louisiana